The 1950 French Grand Prix was a Formula One motor race held on 2 July 1950 at Reims-Gueux. It was race 6 of 7 in the 1950 World Championship of Drivers. The 64-lap race was won by Alfa Romeo driver Juan Manuel Fangio after he started from pole position. His teammate Luigi Fagioli finished second and Peter Whitehead took third in a privateer Ferrari.

Report 
A total of 22 cars entered the event, four of which did not start the race. Franco Comotti did not attend the event; Eugène Chaboud did not start in his own car, instead sharing Philippe Étancelin's Talbot-Lago; and the two Scuderia Ferrari entries of Luigi Villoresi and Alberto Ascari withdrew in practice.

Fangio put in a stunning display with a 116 mph practice lap. With Ferrari not starting their 3-litre cars, the main opposition was to come from the Talbots, complete with dual ignition engines with 12 spark plugs. However, they suffered from radiator problems and overheated, allowing Fangio and Fagioli to lead home another Alfa demonstration run, whilst Farina succumbed to fuel pump trouble. Peter Whitehead finished third despite a fractured head gasket in the last two laps.

Entries 

 — Philippe Étancelin qualified and drove 26 laps of the race in the #16 Talbot-Lago. Eugène Chaboud, who did not start the race despite qualifying in his own car, took over Étancelin's vehicle for 33 laps of the race.
 — Charles Pozzi qualified and drove 14 laps of the race in the #26 Talbot-Lago. Louis Rosier, whose own car had already retired, took over #26 for 42 laps of the race.
 — David Hampshire qualified the #34 Maserati and drove it in the race until he was forced to retire. David Murray, named substitute driver for the car, was not used during the Grand Prix.

Classification

Qualifying

Race 

Notes
 – Includes 1 point for fastest lap

Shared drives 
 Car #16: Philippe Étancelin (first 26 laps) then Eugène Chaboud (33 laps). They shared the points for 5th place.
 Car #26: Charles Pozzi (14 laps) then Louis Rosier (42 laps)

Championship standings after the race 
Drivers' Championship standings

References

Further reading

Sheldon and Rabagliati, A Record of Grand Prix and Voiturette Racing, Volume 5, 1950–1953, 1988

French
French Grand Prix
1950 in French motorsport
French